Chaining is a technique used in applied behavior analysis to teach complex tasks by breaking them down into discrete responses or individual behaviors that are part of a task analysis. With a backward chaining procedure the learning can happen in two ways. In one approach the adult can complete all the steps for the learner and give the learner the opportunity to attempt the last one and prompt as needed. For the other approach the adult can prompt the learner throughout the steps on the chain and give the learner an opportunity to complete the last one independently. However, if unable to do so the adult helps by also prompting the learner through the last step and reinforcement is given to the learner once the last step is completed. Because independency is desired the goal is to remove the prompts as soon as the learner can complete the steps without help.

Task Analysis

A task analysis involves breaking a complex skill into smaller teachable units creating a series of steps or tasks. In other words, it is the identification of all the stimuli and responses in a behavior chain. In backward chain task analysis, the final step of the routine is taught first so that the reinforcement for completing the step is accessible to the naturally occurring reinforcement.

Implementation

In order to teach a task utilizing a backward chaining procedure, begin by breaking down the entire task into individual steps known as a task analysis. 

For example, a tooth brushing routine may be broken down as follows:

1. Grab toothbrush 2. Apply toothpaste to toothbrush, 3. Turn on water 4. Wet toothbrush, 5. Brush top teeth, 6. Brush bottom teeth, 7. Rinse toothbrush, 8. Turn of water 9. Put toothbrush away

The trainer would begin by completing each step for the learner beginning with step one (Grabbing the toothbrush). Once the trainer has completed all steps, the trainer allows the learner to complete the last step (Put toothbrush away) independently. Once this step is independently mastered then the trainer can move on to training the last two steps (Steps 8 and 9). This training will continue until the student is completely independent and can complete the entire tooth brushing routine without assistance. It is important to note that transitioning from one step to the next will vary from learner to learner and should not be done until the learner is proficient in the targeted step.

The trainer can either complete the steps for the leaner or physically prompt the learner through all the steps before allowing the learner to complete the last step independently.

For example, a physical prompting of toothbrushing can look like hand over hand helping the learner complete all the steps correctly before letting the learner complete the last one independently.

Prompting
The two types of prompting in a behavior chain are either most to least(MTL) or least to most (LTM).

MTL prompting is when the most intrusive prompt is introduced initially and then systematically faded out to least intrusive prompts. This prompting method is mainly used when the task analysis is being taught. 

LTM prompting there is no prompt initially, and the intrusiveness of the prompt is increased as necessary for each step of the task analysis. This prompting method is mainly used when you are doing an error correction on a specific step in the task analysis the learner has experience with.

Steps of Implementation
1. When considering if backward chaining is appropriate for the learner one must consider if the learner is learning a new behavior or is it an issue with compliance. If the learner can not perform the task then the chain would be appropriate. If the learner can do the step but chooses not to then another procedure should be used in accordance with compliance.

2. Develop task analysis of the S - R chain
When developing steps of the task analysis the steps should match the learner’s skill level.

3. Collect baseline data

4. Implement

5. Continue to collect data

6. Shift to intermittent reinforcement for maintenance

Fading & Mastery 
In order to fade prompts on the steps being targeted the learner must show increased independence. The fading technique used will be most to least because the skills being worked on are new. The prompts will be decreased to least intrusive when the learner shows increased ability to complete the task with less assistance. 

To determine mastery, assessments are done prior to the chaining procedure being implemented to establish the learner’s mastery level. There are two methods that can be used to assess mastery: single and multiple opportunity. 

 Single Opportunity: the learner is stopped if any step is skipped or they are unable to complete it. 
 Multiple Opportunity: allowing the learner to attempt each step in the chain

Once the mastery level has been established, a mastery criterion is also determined before the chain can be implemented. The mastery criterion is set for each of the steps and learner is said to have mastered the skill once they can perform all steps on the chain at the predetermined mastery criterion.

See also 
 Backward chaining

References

Behavior modification